Sisters First: Stories from Our Wild and Wonderful Life is a 2017 non-fiction book co-authored by Jenna Bush Hager and Barbara Pierce Bush, the fraternal twin daughters of former U.S. President George W. Bush.

This book features alternating narratives from twins born into the Bush dynasty.

References

2017 non-fiction books
Works about the Bush family
Works about twin sisters
Collaborative non-fiction books
Grand Central Publishing books